Andy Macdonald (born July 31, 1973) is an American professional skateboarder. As of September 2013, he holds the record for the most X Games medals in vert skateboarding and won the World Cup Skateboarding competition eight times.

Early life
Macdonald is originally from Melrose, Massachusetts, and started skateboarding in 1986 when he was 12 years old. He graduated from Newton North High School in 1992.

Professional skateboarding
Macdonald became a professional skateboarder in 1994. In 1998 he was selected the "Best Overall Skater" in the "Readers Poll" of Transworld Skateboarding magazine, and was also chosen to host Transworld'''s skateboarding "Trick Tip" video, Starting Point 2: Transitions.  He has received praise for his perennial consistency as he medals in most of the competitions he enters, even beating out a lot of younger skateboarders.

In 1999 Macdonald delivered an anti-drug speech at the White House that was preceded by Macdonald skateboarding down the marble floor of the hallway.

With SBI Enterprises and Bruce Middleton, Macdonald designed the "Flybar 1200", a type of extreme pogo-stick..

In 2022 he announced his intention to try to qualify for the 2024 Summer Olympics representing his father's homeland of Great Britain despite being 50 years at the time of the Paris Games. 

Sponsors
As of September 2013, Macdonald is sponsored by Positiv Skateboards, Airwalk, Amazon.com, MovieTickets.com, Clif Bar, GoPro, Bern Unlimited, Killer Pads, PushWood skatepark locator app, and Theeve Titanium Truck Co.

Video game appearances
In 1999, he was featured in the video game MTV Sports: Skateboarding featuring Andy MacDonald for the Dreamcast, PlayStation, and PC. He was also featured in the PC game Backyard Skateboarding''.

Contest history
1st in 1996–2000, 2002, 2012 World Cup
1st in 1997–2002 X Games: vert doubles (with Tony Hawk)
3rd in 2009 X Games 15 Vert Competition
2nd in 2009 X Games 15 Park
Andy has been involved in promoting skateboarding and its growth, progression and exposure since as far back as his days as an instructor at the YMCA in Peabody MA (1989) right near his hometown of North Andover.

Personal life
As of September 2013, Macdonald resides in Encinitas, California, with his wife, Rebecca, and their three children: Hayden, Natalie, and Zoe.

References

External links
 
 

1973 births
American skateboarders
Living people
X Games athletes
Newton North High School alumni